In Greek mythology, Porphyrion (Ancient Greek: Πορφυρίων) may refer to the following characters:

 Porphyrion, one of the Giants, offspring of Gaea, born from the blood that fell when Uranus (Sky) was castrated by their son Cronus.
 Porphyrion, also known as Ornytion, a King of Corinth after succeeding his father, Sisyphus, the great trickster. His mother was the Pleiad Merope, daughter of the Titan Atlas, and brother to Glaucus, Thersander and Almus.
 Porphyrion, son of Celeus and one of the Athenian sacrificial victims for the Minotaur. He may be the brother of Hesione, another sacrificial victim granting that their father is only one and the same.

Notes

References 

 Hesiod, Theogony, in The Homeric Hymns and Homerica with an English Translation by Hugh G. Evelyn-White, Cambridge, Massachusetts.,Harvard University Press; London, William Heinemann Ltd. 1914. Online version at the Perseus Digital Library.
Maurus Servius Honoratus, In Vergilii carmina comentarii. Servii Grammatici qui feruntur in Vergilii carmina commentarii; recensuerunt Georgius Thilo et Hermannus Hagen. Georgius Thilo. Leipzig. B. G. Teubner. 1881. Online version at the Perseus Digital Library.

Princes in Greek mythology
Kings of Corinth
Attican characters in Greek mythology
Corinthian characters in Greek mythology
Attic mythology
Corinthian mythology